Olivera Jevtić (born 24 July 1977) is a Serbian long-distance runner.  She has represented her country five times at the Olympics in 2000, 2004, 2008, 2012 and 2016.

Running career
Jevtić was born in Titovo Užice, Yugoslavia, otherwise known presently as Užice, Serbia. Her parents are father Milorad and mother Draginja. She is based in her native city, coached by Slavoljub "Slavko" Kuzmanović, and she competes for the running club AK Mladost Užice. Jevtić holds the Serbian marathon record of 2:25:23, which she established at the Rotterdam Marathon in 2003. She won the silver medal in the marathon at the 2006 European Athletics Championships in Gothenburg, Sweden. In December 2007, coach Kuzmanović and Jevtić went on an altitude training trip to Eldoret, Kenya, when violent conflict erupted from the 2007 Kenyan election crisis. Although they wanted to continue working out in spite of the violence, her training partner, Stanley Kipruto, insisted that their lives were in danger and led them out of Eldoret so that they could leave the country from Jomo Kenyatta International Airport. After Jevtić and Kuzmanović were picked up by a Serbian diplomat-evacuation flight, Kipruto was caught by rebels, tortured, and lost four fingers. Subsequent to the violence in Kenya, Kipruto moved in to live with Jevtić and Kuzmanović in Užice and joined their running team Mladost.

She won the women's race at the Balkan Cross Country Championships in March 2011.

Jevtić was selected as young athlete of the year of 1996. In 2006 she was awarded Golden Badge of Sport, award for the sportsperson of the Year in Serbia, and the same year, and the 1998 and 1999 was declared the best sportswoman by the Olympic Committee of Serbia and Yugoslavia.

Jevtić was stripped of third place in 2002 New York City Marathon and received a public warning after testing positive for the banned drug ephedrine. The president of NYRR at the time, Alan Steinfeld, told the New York Times that it was likely an "innocent mistake" and that ephedrine is common in cough suppressants.

During the start of the 2020 Sofia Marathon in Bulgaria, Jevtić was assaulted by the Bulgarian citizen.

National titles
Yugoslav Athletics Championships
1500 m: 1994, 1996
5000 m: 1996
Yugoslav Half Marathon Championships
Women's race: 1998, 1999, 2002
Yugoslavia Cross Country Championships
Women's race: 1994, 1995, 1996, 1997, 1998, 1999, 2000

Results 
 2021 Belgrade Half Marathon 1st place
 2015 Sarajevo Half Marathon 1st place
 2014 Sarajevo Half Marathon 1st place
 2013 European Team Championships, Second league 5000 m - 1st place
 2013 European Cup 10,000m - 3rd place
 2013 Belgrade Marathon 1st place
 2012 European Cross Country Championships 26th place
 2012 Podgorica Marathon 1st place
 2011 European Cross Country Championships 21st place
 2011 Torino Marathon 5th place
 2010 European Championship marathon 4th place
 2009 Saint Silvester Road Race 2nd place
 2009 Sarajevo Half Marathon 1st place
 2009 Belgrade Half Marathon 1st place
 2009 Podgorica Marathon 1st place
 2008 Belgrade Half Marathon 1st place
 2007 Porto Half Marathon 2nd place
 2006 Boston Marathon 7th place
 2006 European Championship marathon silver medal
 2005 Saint Silvester Marathon 1st place
 2004 Boston Marathon 3rd place
 2004 Olympic Games marathon 6th place
 2003 New York City Marathon 9th place
 2003 World Championship marathon 8th place
 2003 Amsterdam Marathon 1st place
 2002 New York City Marathon 3rd place (debut and DSQ)
 2002 New York City Mini Marathon 4th place
 2001 World Half Marathon Championships 7th place
 1998 Saint Silvester Marathon 1st place
 1998 European Championship 10,000 m fourth
 1998 European Championship 5000 m fourth
 1996 World Junior Championship in Athletics 5000 m silver medal

See also 
 Serbian records in athletics
 Serbia and Montenegro at the 2004 Summer Olympics
 Yugoslavia at the 2000 Summer Olympics

References

External links 

 
 
 
 
 

1977 births
Living people
Sportspeople from Užice
Yugoslav female marathon runners
Serbian female marathon runners
Serbian female long-distance runners
Yugoslav female long-distance runners
Serbian female cross country runners
Yugoslav female cross country runners
Serbia and Montenegro athletes
Olympic athletes of Yugoslavia
Olympic athletes of Serbia and Montenegro
Olympic athletes of Serbia
Athletes (track and field) at the 2012 Summer Olympics
Athletes (track and field) at the 2008 Summer Olympics
Athletes (track and field) at the 2004 Summer Olympics
Athletes (track and field) at the 2000 Summer Olympics
Athletes (track and field) at the 2016 Summer Olympics
Doping cases in athletics
Serbian sportspeople in doping cases
European Athletics Championships medalists
World Athletics Championships athletes for Serbia and Montenegro
Mediterranean Games silver medalists for Serbia
Mediterranean Games bronze medalists for Yugoslavia
Mediterranean Games silver medalists for Yugoslavia
Mediterranean Games bronze medalists for Serbia
Athletes (track and field) at the 1997 Mediterranean Games
Athletes (track and field) at the 2001 Mediterranean Games
Athletes (track and field) at the 2005 Mediterranean Games
Athletes (track and field) at the 2009 Mediterranean Games
Mediterranean Games medalists in athletics